Thorpe is an unincorporated community in Dallas County, in the U.S. state of Missouri. The community lies just north of the Dallas-Webster county line, with Missouri Route W and the Niangua River passing about one mile to the east. The community lies approximately midway between Buffalo, eleven miles to the northwest and Marshfield, eleven miles to the southeast.

History
A post office called Thorpe was established in 1880, and remained in operation until 1907. The community has the name of J. G. T. Thorpe, a pioneer citizen.

References

Unincorporated communities in Dallas County, Missouri
Unincorporated communities in Missouri